Dartford Cricket Club is one of the oldest cricket clubs in England with origins which date from the early 18th century, perhaps earlier. The earliest known match involving a team from Dartford took place in 1722, against London, but the club's own website says it was formally established in 1727. The club is still in existence and now plays in the Kent Cricket League.

History
Dartford players were reckoned by Robert Harley, Earl of Oxford, writing in his diary in 1723, to "lay claim to the greatest excellence" among English cricketers. The club played a number of big matches against London and, in 1756, they were involved in a tri-series against the sport's rising power, the Hambledon Club.

Dartford produced several famous players in the 18th century including cricket's earliest known great player William Bedle. Later players included William Hodsoll, John Bell, John Frame and Ned Wenman.

The club originally used Dartford Brent, an area of common land, as its ground. By the end of the 18th century it had moved to Bowman's Lodge on Dartford Heath before its current ground at Hesketh Park was established in 1905. In 2002 the club merged with Dartford Halls Cricket Club, retaining the name Dartford Cricket Club for its First XI.

References

Cricket in Kent
Dartford
English club cricket teams
English cricket teams in the 18th century
Former senior cricket clubs
Sports clubs established in the 17th century